Blackberry Rose is the second studio album by Lavender Country, released 49 years after their private press debut. It was released on February 18, 2022, via Don Giovanni Records. In 2019 the group self-released Blackberry Rose and Other Stories on CD and sold it at local shows. The album used the same cover art, but contained a different track list and alternate versions of the songs found on the 2022 release, as well as a new version of “I Can't Shake the Stranger Out of You”, from the band's titular first album.

Track listing

References

Don Giovanni Records albums
2022 albums